Koceila Berchiche (born August 5, 1985 in Beni Douala) is an Algerian football player who is currently playing for JSM Béjaïa in the Algerian Ligue Professionnelle 2.

Club career
Berchiche started his career in the junior ranks for JS Kabylie but left to join MO Béjaïa and then USM Alger. His first senior side was WA Rouiba where he played for 2 seasons before joining JS Kabylie in the summer of 2008 on a free transfer.

International career
Berchiche is a member of the Algerian Primary Team.

Honours
 Won the World Military Cup once with the Algerian National Military Team in 2011

References

1985 births
Living people
People from Beni Douala
Kabyle people
Algerian footballers
Algerian Ligue Professionnelle 1 players
JS Kabylie players
MO Béjaïa players
MC El Eulma players
USM Alger players
Association football midfielders
21st-century Algerian people